is a Japanese reality television series and the fifth installment of the Terrace House franchise. It follows three men and three women as they temporarily live together in a house in the Setagaya ward of Tokyo, Japan. It premiered on Netflix Japan as a Netflix Original on May 14, 2019.

In April 2020, the production of the show was halted due to the COVID-19 pandemic in Japan. The show resumed airing episodes that were filmed prior to the suspension of production in May 2020, but the release of new episodes was again suspended following the suicide of cast member Hana Kimura on May 23, 2020.

Following Kimura's death, Fuji Television announced their decision to cancel the season on May 27, 2020, leaving the final two produced episodes of the show unaired. Netflix removed the season from its searchable database in Japan in mid-2020 and pulled all episodes featuring Kimura on August 10, 2020 in international markets.

Cast

Main cast 

*Age when they first joined Terrace House.

Timeline

Guest appearances

Episodes

Production 
The 2019–2020 season was originally planned as an extended Terrace House edition with an extended run of episodes that would lead up to the Tokyo 2020 Summer Olympics. In the first episode, the panel spoke about the ambitions of this special season which would culminate around the same time as the global sporting event.

Comedian Yoshimi Tokui, a panel regular, took leave from the show in late 2019 after he was charged with not reporting income of over 100 million yen over a period of three years for his one-person company. He apologized, saying he missed the payments due to his "sloppiness and neglectfulness."

In April 2020, the production of the show was halted due to the COVID-19 pandemic in Japan, a decision that was announced shortly after the postponement of the Summer Olympics on March 30, 2020. The show resumed airing episodes that were filmed prior to the suspension of production in May 2020 with Ryota Yamasato hosting the commentary segments alone, before Reina Triendl joined him to co-host.

But the release of new episodes was again suspended following the suicide of cast member Hana Kimura on May 23, 2020. Following Kimura's death, Fuji Television announced their decision to cancel the season on May 27, 2020, leaving the final two produced episodes of the show (episodes 43 and 44) unaired.

Death of Hana Kimura 
On May 23, 2020, cast member Hana Kimura died by suicide while isolating at her own home during the COVID-19 pandemic.

Before her death, Kimura shared a picture of herself and her cat on Instagram with the words, "I love you, have a happy long life. Sorry." She also tweeted hours before her death: "Every day, I receive nearly 100 honest opinions and I cannot deny that I get hurt."

Several notes were discovered in her apartment, with one addressed to her mother. Kimura's death led to a widespread conversation about cyberbullying messages she faced from Terrace House viewers, a situation that escalated after the episode "Case of the Costume Incident," which included a scene where she was involved in a fight with cast member Kai Kobayashi over him accidentally washing her wrestling costume.

Hana Kimura's mother Kyoko Kimura claimed in weekly magazine Shūkan Bunshun that Hana was pressured by the staff to stage the fight with Kobayashi. In July 2020, she filed a complaint with the Broadcasting Ethics & Program Improvement Organization claiming the producers edited the program to misrepresent her daughter as violent. She said the program violated her daughter's personal and human rights and continued shooting even after her daughter hyperventilated following the dispute with Kobayashi.

Kobayashi also claimed in Shūkan Bunshun that he was asked by the staff to touch her breast.

In August 2020, Fuji Television released an internal report which outlined some of the circumstances surrounding Hana's experience on the show and her subsequent suicide. The producers noted in the report that Hana engaged in self-harm after the fight with Kobayashi. They said staff had met with her on a number of occasions where they suggested she stop using social media and seek professional care.

Hana's mother disputed the report's findings, saying she doubted the investigation was impartial, and that the TV network could have foreseen the cyber bullying because of their past experience with the popular show.

On August 10, Netflix removed episodes 20 to 42 from its streaming platform across all international markets. Episode 20 featured a brief introduction of Kimura before she entered the house, while on all subsequent episodes she was one of the housemates.

Kyoko Kimura announced in December 2021 that she will file a lawsuit against Fuji TV and a production company.

Reception 
A story arc involving Toshiyuki Niino and Yume Yoshida saw Tom Hanaway of The Japan Times write a piece criticizing the show and its commentary panel for not making "a bigger deal" about consent. In the episode "Angel," Niino is shown smearing lip balm on Yoshida's lips and then suddenly kissing her for the first time, without asking permission. On another date in the episode "Another Terrace!!," Yoshida had to decline Niino's physical advances "over a dozen times."

Hanaway generalized the studio commentators' reactions to these moments by saying they first sympathize with the woman, "before typically ending up at the outdated sentiment: She was asking for it." He noted that while several Western media outlets and online viewers criticized them over a similar situation in the previous season, the panel members had yet to face any backlash in Japan for their remarks - or lack thereof - on consent. He wrote that "The conversation on consent in Japan hasn't progressed as far as it has in some places abroad, but those places are precisely where the show is popular." In a YouTube video he made with Vivi where they discussed how the Terrace House program only shows short clips of their lives at the house and viewers then think they know them as a result, Niino briefly addressed foreign viewers who accused him of sexual assault based only on seeing the clips; "it's the person's decision whether it's a sexual assault or not. If the person says it is, then it is. But who are you to judge?"

References

Further reading

External links 
Official website
Terrace House: Tokyo 2019-2020 on Netflix
Official YouTube Channel Includes bonus material per episode.

Fuji TV original programming
Japanese-language Netflix original programming
Japanese reality television series
Television shows set in Tokyo